Hyaluronan and proteoglycan link protein 2 (HAPLN2) also known as brain link protein 1 (BRAL1) is a protein that in humans is encoded by the HAPLN2 gene. HAPLN1 codes for a related link protein that is expressed in cartilage while Bral1 is expressed in brain.

Function 
Bral1 interacts with versican and brevican in nodes of Ranvier. In mice with reduced Bralp1 expression the extracellular matrix at nodes of Ranvier is disrupted and action potential conduction is abnormal.

References

Further reading 

 
 
 
 
 
 
 

Human proteins